The Scourge of the Underworld is the name of a series of fictional characters appearing in American comic books published by Marvel Comics.

Writer/editor Mark Gruenwald originally created the Scourge in 1985 as a plot device intended to thin the criminal population of the Marvel Universe, in particular eliminating those supervillain characters he deemed to be too minor, redundant, or ill-conceived. Numerous other characters have used the name, often with differing motives and loyalties.

Organization
The Scourge is originally depicted as an individual vigilante dedicated to the assassination of criminals. This person, whose true name has never been revealed, is seen over the course of several months murdering known supervillains. The Scourge approaches a supervillain in disguise, shoots him or her with an explosive-tipped bullet, shouts his catchphrase "Justice is served!" and disappears. This first iteration's killing spree reaches its apex in Captain America #319, where he guns down eighteen such criminals at an underworld meeting which is, ironically, held to devise a way of countering the menace of the Scourge. The Scourge disguises himself as the bartender, whom nobody thinks to search. When Captain America captures the Scourge in the following issue, the character claimed to be the brother of the Enforcer, whom Scourge has killed because his sibling's criminal activities has shamed their father. He claims that this crime led to him creating the Scourge persona with help from a private investigator only identified as "Domino", who provides him detailed information on the supervillain community. Immediately after making this confession, the Scourge is himself shot and killed by an unseen assailant, who is heard to cry "Justice is served!" in the fashion of the Scourge's other killings.

In Captain America #326, Captain America is confronted by a hologram of the Scourge, operated by Doctor Faustus, to try to kill Captain America via having him confront "ghosts" of several villains who had recently died in battle against him. Later on, in Captain America #347, Albert Malik, the communist villain who assumed the Red Skull identity during the 1950s, is killed by a mercenary who breaks Malik out of prison only to murder him. After killing Malik, the mercenary shouts the Scourge's catchphrase. In Captain America #350, Scourge is shown to be part of an assembly of villains working for the Red Skull, many of which Captain America had fought following the Red Skull's "death" in Captain America #300. The Red Skull gloated of having created the Scourge organization, as part of a massive network of criminal organizations that carried out the Nazi's will. The Scourge presented is promptly killed by John Walker who had recently assumed the Captain America identity.

In Captain America #351, the Commission on Super-Hero Affairs had an agent impersonate the Scourge of the Underworld to "kill" Captain America due to Walker's identity having been made public and whose parents had been killed as a result of retaliation by the Watchdog organization. This story featured the first in-story appearance of the Scourge's official costume (see Appearances below).

A new Scourge appeared in Captain America #358-362, in a story where a new version attempts to kill the criminal super-scientist "The Power Broker". This version appears to be operating independently of the Red Skull, claiming to want the Power Broker dead due to the fact that his "treatment" to give people super-powers, had left his brother horribly deformed instead. USAgent (John Walker) and former Captain America ally Vagabond stopped the Scourge though much in the same way as the version that Captain America fought, the killer was shot by a hidden gunman who screamed "Justice Is Served". Rather than get this version to a doctor, Walker allows him to die from his wound in order to instead try to find the gunman.

Another version of the Scourge, working for Red Skull, shows up in Captain America #394; after a failed attempt by the German government to arrest and try Red Skull for crimes against humanity ended in Red Skull escaping, Skull went into hiding and had a Scourge of the Underworld under his employment murder three clones, of himself and his two associates (Crossbones and Mother Night) to fake their deaths. During a later meeting of his various terrorist groups, a man identified as the Scourge is executed via the Red Dust of Death after lying about several failed attempts on lives of super-villains Red Skull had marked for death. The exchange between the Skull and the Scourge, implies that Red Skull stole the identity of the Scourge for his own agenda when he accuses his henchman of "ruining the good name of the Scourge of the Underworld" with his failures. Mother Night later uses her illusion casting power to create an illusion of the Scourge, to allow additional henchmen of the Red Skull to avoid capture by Captain America.

In 1993, Mark Gruenwald, who had created the Scourge of the Underworld and written nearly all of the main appearances of the character in Captain America, wrote a four-part USAgent mini-series, in order to resolve the looming mysteries involving the character and his various forms and masters.

The mini-series revealed that the Scourge of the Underworld was created by Thomas Holloway, the former Golden Age superhero known as Angel, who ran the organization with help from Domino and two henchmen known as Caprice and Bloodstain. Holloway had initially gone into retirement after a battle with a villain resulted in the death of a civilian. When the second Age of Heroes came about decades later, Halloway vowed to eliminate the newer generation of supervillains through any means necessary to protect the people, and therefore established the Scourge organization. The mini-series also confirmed the existence of female Scourge of the Underworld agents, as one of the villain's previous kills (Titania by a Scourge impersonating fellow villain Gold Digger in a women's locker room) had left unanswered questions to whether or not the murder of Titania was done by a female Scourge, since the villain would not be able to pass as a woman in such an intimate setting as a women's locker room.

The series has Vagabond trying to join the group and is sent on her first mission. Unfortunately she finds her first victim, a former Daredevil villain known as the Matador, to now be a single father who has served his time and abandoned his criminal lifestyle, who begs Vagabond to spare him for his son's sake. Marked for death for failing to do her assignment, Vagabond recruits USAgent to help bring down the organization. During the ensuing fight, the Scourge sent to kill Vagabond and USAgent is captured but killed as USAgent is taken before Bloodstain, who attempts to brainwash USAgent into joining the Scourges. Bloodstain reveals himself to be USAgent's deceased brother Mike Walker, though it's never revealed if this is true or just a disguise designed to manipulate USAgent, with Walker himself denying the idea that his brother would be part of such an organisation. Walker is informed of Halloway's role in running the organization and in the ensuing final battle, Domino and Bloodstain are killed while a large angel-shaped gravestone falls on the invalid Halloway. Though the USAgent mini-series implies the statue killed him, Captain America #440 reveals that Halloway survived and managed to avoid arrest due to his army of lawyers and had gone back into seclusion.

Later entries for the Scourge in various Official Marvel Handbook specials, would clarify the Red Skull connection, which the USAgent mini-series never outright addressed. These entries ultimately state that the Red Skull learned of the existence of the Scourge of the Underworld organization and managed to convince several of Halloway's agents to switch sides and work for him.

Appearance
The Scourge mainly appeared in disguise, though for the final battle with Captain America in Captain America #320, he dressed in an all-black commando costume, which his hologram self later is seen wearing in Captain America #326. For his entry in the Official Handbook  of the Marvel Universe Deluxe Edition, a new costume was designed for the character: white skull mask, opera hat, and a white buttoned-up trenchcoat and white gloves. This costume was used sporadically in later stories.

The Deadly Foes of Spider-Man
The Scourge plays a major role in several storylines involving the Shocker in the early 1990s. The mini-series The Deadly Foes of Spider-Man, Shocker showed that the Spider-Man villain had become obsessively paranoid and convinced the Scourge was out to get him. During the climax of the storyline, the Kingpin employs an unseen Scourge imposter to fake an attempt on the Shocker's life, which prevents him from killing Spider-Man and causes him to flee the scene, all in order to avoid attention being drawn near a location that the Kingpin wants to rob.

In Amazing Spider-Man #364, Shocker attempts to rob several research centers in order to gain technology to enhance his suit's weapons, so as to increase his chances in battle against the Scourge.

Later versions
In the pages of Thunderbolts, a new version appears; this iteration assassinates the Thunderbolts members Jolt, Helmut Zemo and Techno, as well as a pair of civilians (Gayle Rogers and Roberta Haggerty) who investigate Jolt's death. This Scourge is actually Jack Monroe who is being mentally controlled by the superhuman-hating government agent Henry Peter Gyrich who himself was being manipulated by Baron Strucker. Monroe is defeated and freed from Gyrich's control by the Thunderbolts and their allies, the Redeemers. He then, apparently, abandons the Scourge equipment and identity after the battle. As Scourge, Monroe had access to a wide array of technology based on equipment confiscated from super-villains. Some are installed in the costume, while several others are miniaturized using Pym particles and stored in one of the costume's gauntlets; all are accessible by a voice-coded system. Specific items used include versions of the Green Goblin's glider, the Unicorn's helmet-installed energy projector, and Stilt-Man's telescoping stilts, as well as various unspecified weaponry, including a metal quarterstaff. He could also access his gauntlet's Pym particles to alter the size of himself or others, though excessive use of this ability on Atlas forced him to abandon much of his weapon stores when his Pym particles supply was spent.

Five characters bearing the names of the Scourge's previous victims – Hellrazor, Caprice, Mindwave (minus the hyphen), Mirage and Bluestreak appear in the "Caged Angels" storyline in Thunderbolts #116-121. All five villains are telepaths, who allow themselves to be captured so they can be taken into custody at the Thunderbolts's headquarters. Once there, they use their combined powers to drive several members of the Thunderbolts into homicidal rages in order to force the team to destroy each other. They are only stopped in doing so, by Bullseye who had been recovering from injuries and not factored into their plan and murders them in their cells before they could use their powers on him.

The Punisher impersonates the Scourge again in an attempt to take down the Kingpin.

During the "Dark Reign" storyline, Norman Osborn asks the Hood to hunt the Punisher in retaliation for an failed assassination attempt. The Hood is granted the Dark Dimension's powers by his master Dormammu to revive eighteen murdered criminals (Basilisk, Bird-Man, Black Abbott, Blue Streak, Cheetah, Cyclone, Death Adder, Firebrand, Hijacker, Human Fly, Letha, Megatak, Mind-Wave, Miracle Man, Mirage, Titania, Turner D. Century and Wraith) to help take down the Punisher. Scourge tells the villains that if they fail, they will be returned to their previous states of death and rot. The Hood tells these criminals that the Scourge of the Underworld is actually Frank Castle and by killing him they would be avenging their previous deaths and prolonging their new lives. When Microchip asks if he thinks any of them believed the story, the Hood replies "Sure they did". Several of these villains (including Firebrand, Wraith. Cheetah, Cyclone, and Mirage) are killed again while confronting the Punisher, but ultimately Basilisk and Death Adder subdue the vigilante, and the terms of the Hood's agreement are apparently fulfilled.

The original version of Scourge of the Underworld is among the various people in Erebus when Hercules travels to the Underworld. He is later seen in Pluto's jury (alongside Abomination, Armless Tiger Man, Artume, Heinrich Zemo, Commander Kraken, Iron Monger, Jack O'Lantern, Kyknos, Nessus, Orka and Veranke) at Zeus's trial.

Another person christened with identity is assigned to the Thunderbolts by Osborn. His first mission is to eliminate Songbird. This character is later revealed to be Frank Simpson with a new identity.

Another iteration joins up with Villains for Hire, the villain counterpart of Heroes for Hire. This character was in fact Paladin in disguise as part of a massive con to take down the Purple Man.

Another new version is shown to be using a list of the locations of supervillains who have been relocated via the witness protection program and killing them, most recently Viper, member of the Serpent Squad. In the battle, he severely injures the hero (and former villain) Diamondback who recognizes his voice. He is then shown to be working for Henry Gyrich, revealed to be under the influence of Hydra. Encountering the villain the Rattler, whom Scourge subdues and kills after a short but brutal fight, he pulls off his damaged mask, shattered from the fight, and reveals he is Dennis Dunphy.

Villains killed by the Scourge

Villains who escaped The Scourge

Reception
 In 2014, WhatCulture ranked Scourge of the Underworld 7th in their "7 Unused Spider-Man Villains Who'd Be Great In The Marvel Cinematic Universe" list.

References

External links
 Scourge of the Underworld at Marvel.com
 

Comics characters introduced in 1985
Characters created by John Byrne (comics)
Characters created by Mark Gruenwald
Comic book terrorist organizations
Fictional assassins in comics
Fictional mass murderers
Fictional serial killers
Marvel Comics supervillains
Vigilante characters in comics